William Thickness (died c. 1403), of Newcastle-under-Lyme, Staffordshire, was an English politician.

He was a Member (MP) of the Parliament of England for Newcastle-under-Lyme in 1378, January 1380, October 1382, April 1384, February 1388 and September 1388.

He was Mayor of Newcastle-under-Lyme in 1372–73, 1379–1381, 1382–1384, 1385–86, 1387–88, 1395–96 and 1399–1400.

References

14th-century births
1403 deaths
English MPs 1378
Members of the Parliament of England for Newcastle-under-Lyme
English MPs January 1380
English MPs October 1382
English MPs April 1384
English MPs February 1388
English MPs September 1388